Paul L. Wagner (September 19, 1897 – September 10, 1991) was an American politician from Pennsylvania.

Wagner born in Tamaqua, Schuylkill County, Pennsylvania, September 19, 1897 and died in Coaldale, Pennsylvania, September 10, 1991. He served two non-consecutive terms in the Pennsylvania House of Representatives, beginning in 1939 to 1944.  He was then elected to the Pennsylvania State Senate from 1945 and served until 1964.

Background 
Paul Wagner was the son of Samuel Paul Wagner (1872–1944) and Emma Elizabeth Fox (1874–1939).  His father was a traveling salesman.  His father died days after his initial election to the Pennsylvania State Senate.

Wagner graduated from Tamaqua High School in 1915.  He then graduated from the Alexander Hamilton Institute. He worked in various businesses including as district sales manager for Bastian Brothers Company and Jostens, Inc. (jewelers), seemingly following in his father’s footsteps as a salesman, but also as the city editor and in the sports department for the Tamaqua Evening Courier newspaper.

Political career 
He was first elected as a Republican to the Pennsylvania House of Representatives (for Schuylkill County) for the 1939 term and served one term.  He served on the Committee to Investigate Manner of Conducting Civil Service Examinations (1939–1940). He was unsuccessful in his campaign for re-election to the House in 1940. However he continued to work in the House as a Speaker’s appointee to the Committee to Investigate Unemployment Compensation Civil Service (1941–1942).  He was then re-elected to the House for the 1943 term.

He was initially elected to the Pennsylvania State Senate in 1945 and served twenty consecutive years until 1964, when he retired. While in the Senate he served on the following:
Commission to Study School System (1945–1946)
Joint Legislative Sub-Committee on Municipal Authorities (1945–1946)
Joint Legislative Committee on Retirement Systems and Laws (1947–1948)
Joint Legislative Committee on Education (1947–1948)
Joint Legislative Committee on Post-High School Education (1947–1948)
Joint Legislative Committee on Juvenile Delinquency and Child Welfare (1947–1948)
Post-High School Commission (1947–1948)
Joint State Government Commission (1949–1956)
Advisory Council on Library Development (1961–1964)
Pennsylvania Higher Education Assistance Agency (1963–1964).  Wagner was the first chairman of this agency and helped to consolidate the commonwealth's school districts.

Wagner actually did not retire in 1964.  Wagner had run for re-election on November 4, 1964 against Albert I. Nagle.  The returns of the votes from the polls indicated that Nagle led by less than 600 votes. Attention then focused on 2,800 absentee ballots. When the Board of Elections met to count these, both candidates immediately entered challenges to a substantial number of the ballots before the envelopes containing those ballots were opened. After a hearing the Board filed its decision overruling the challenges in some instances and sustaining them in others. Both candidates then appealed to the Court of Common Pleas of Schuylkill County questioning the legality of the Board's decision.  Subsequently, the court ruled to sustain the decision of the Board in part and reversing it in part. Wagner then filed an appeal.  By the time the Pennsylvania Supreme Court decided to affirm, the next election cycle had taken place (November 1966), and neither Wagner nor Nagle were able to claim the seat.

After he retired from politics, Wagner became president of the First National Bank, Tamaqua. He was responsible for negotiating a merger with the Miners National Bank of Pottsville (a predecessor of Santander Bank). He then later served as a bank director emeritus.

Personal life 
He was married to Marguerite Ott (1901–1992).

References

Republican Party members of the Pennsylvania House of Representatives
1897 births
1991 deaths
People from Tamaqua, Pennsylvania
20th-century American politicians